This event was held on February 2, 2013 as a part of the 2013 UCI Cyclo-cross World Championships in Louisville, Kentucky, United States. Marianne Vos dominated the race and took home her sixth cyclo-cross world title.

Ranking

References

Women's elite race
UCI Cyclo-cross World Championships – Women's elite race
UCI Cyclo, Women's Elite